Epameinondas Thomopoulos (Greek: Επαμεινώνδας Θωμόπουλος, 1878 - January 4, 1976) was a Greek artist who attended the academy and the first Greek impressionist.

He studied drawing in Italy.  It was his years as professor of the arts school and for two years at a school from 1948 until 1949.  In 1949, he was elected member of the Athens Academy and in 1962, he was appointed president of the same member.

Most of his works and drawings  are related with nature.  Many of these are preserved in the Patras city hall and the National Gallery of Greece.

In 1996, the city of Patras awarded a large spot in the National Gallery of the city.

References
T. Iliadou-Maniaki Epameinondas Thomopoulos Achaikes Ekdoseis, Patras 
The first version of the article is translated and is based from the article at the Greek Wikipedia (el:Main Page)

1878 births
1976 deaths
Members of the Academy of Athens (modern)
Artists from Patras
20th-century Greek painters
Munich School
19th-century Greek painters
Greek expatriates in Italy